Sabanilla is a town and one of the 119 Municipalities of Chiapas, in southern Mexico.

As of 2010, the municipality had a total population of 25,187, up from 21,156 as of 2005. It covers an area of 171.4 km2.

As of 2010, the town of Sabanilla had a population of 3,052. Other than the town of Sabanilla, the municipality had 77 localities, the largest of which (with 2010 populations in parentheses) were: Los Naranjos (2,348), Moyos (1,945), El Calvario (1,262), Buenavista (1,229), Majastic (1,221), El Paraíso (1,081), and Cristóbal Colón (1,000), classified as rural.

History
Sabanilla was founded in 1771 by 150 migrants from the surrounding villages of Moyos and Tila. They sent a letter to the Spanish King, Carlos III, signed by the only literate person, Matheo Diaz. The priest of Moyos approved the foundation of the settlement.

References

Boletin del Archivo Histórico Diocesano. Vol 6, Septiembre 1997. San Cristóbal de las Casas.

Municipalities of Chiapas